The geography of the European Netherlands is unusual in that much of its land has been reclaimed from the sea and is below sea level, protected by dikes. With a population of 17.4 million and density of  makes it the second most densely populated member of the European Union after Malta, and the 12th most densely populated country in the world, behind only three countries with a population over 16 million. Consequently, the Netherlands is highly urbanized.

Statistics 
Geographic coordinates: 

The Dutch RD coordinate system (Rijksdriehoeksmeting) is also in common use. For transformation to and from geographical coordinates there is an official procedure RDNAPTRANS™ and approximate as well as precise tools available. The west–east coordinate is between 0 and 280 km, and the south–north coordinate between 300 and 620 km.

Area:
total: 
land:  
water: 

Land boundaries:
total:  
border countries:

Belgium 
Germany 

Coastline:  

Maritime claims:
territorial sea: 
contiguous zone: 
exclusive economic zone:  with  

Climate: temperate; marine; cool summers and mild winters (European mainland), tropical (Caribbean islands)

Terrain: mostly coastal lowland and reclaimed land (polders); some hills in southeast

Elevation extremes:
lowest point: Zuidplaspolder (Nieuwerkerk aan den IJssel) , below sea level.

Natural resources: natural gas, petroleum, peat, limestone, salt, sand and gravel, arable land

Land use: (2011)
arable land: 25.08%
permanent crops: 0.88%
other: 74.04%

Irrigated land (2007):  

Total renewable water resources (2011):  

Natural hazards: flooding by sea and rivers is a constant danger. The extensive system of dikes, dams, and sand dunes protect nearly one-half of the total area from being flooded during the heavy autumn storms from the north-west.

Environment – current issues: water pollution in the form of heavy metals, organic compounds, and fertilisers such as nitrates and phosphates; air pollution from vehicles and refining activities; acid rain

Environment – international agreements:
party to:
Air Pollution, Air Pollution-Nitrogen Oxides, Air Pollution-Persistent Organic Pollutants, Air Pollution-Sulphur 85, Air Pollution-Sulphur 94, Air Pollution-Volatile Organic Compounds, Antarctic-Environmental Protocol, Antarctic Treaty, Biodiversity, Climate Change, Climate Change-Kyoto Protocol, Desertification, Endangered Species, Environmental Modification, Hazardous Wastes, Law of the Sea, Marine Dumping, Marine Life Conservation, Ozone Layer Protection, Ship Pollution, Tropical Timber 83, Tropical Timber 94, Wetlands, Whaling
signed, but not ratified:
none

Landscape
The country can be split into two areas: the low and flat lands in the west and north, and the higher lands with minor hills in the east and south. An extensive range of seawalls and coastal dunes protect the Netherlands from the sea, and levees and dikes along the rivers protect against river flooding. A recent global remote sensing analysis suggested that there were 1,025km² of tidal flats in the Netherlands, making it the 31st ranked country in terms of tidal flat area. The rest of the country is mostly flat; only in the extreme south of the country does the land rise to any significant extent, in the foothills of the Ardennes mountains. The highest point of the entire country is Mount Scenery (887 metres or 2,910 ft), which is located outside the European part of the Netherlands, on the island of Saba in the Caribbean. The Netherlands is located at mouths of three major European rivers (Rhine, Maas or Meuse, and Scheldt).

In November 2016, the Netherlands and Belgium agreed to cede small, uninhabited parcels of land to reflect a change in course of the river Meuse (or Maas, in Dutch). The land swap is to take effect as of 2018.

Urbanization

Largest cities 
With their provinces in November 2019:

 Amsterdam  (North Holland) 872,680 inhabitants
 Rotterdam  (South Holland) 650,711
 The Hague ('s-Gravenhage)  (South Holland) 544,766
 Utrecht  (Utrecht) 357,179
 Eindhoven  (North Brabant) 234,235

Climate

The predominant wind direction in the European Netherlands is southwest, which causes a mild maritime climate, with moderately warm summers and cool winters, and typically high humidity. This is especially true close to the Dutch coastline, where the difference in temperature between summer and winter, as well as between day and night is noticeably smaller than it is in the southeast of the country.

Ice days—maximum temperature below —usually occur from December until February, with the occasional rare ice day prior to or after that period. Freezing days—minimum temperature below —occur much more often, usually ranging from mid-November to late March, but not rarely measured as early as mid-October and as late as mid-May. On average, snow can occur from November to April but sometimes occurs in May or October too.

Precipitation throughout the year is distributed relatively equally each month. Summer and autumn months tend to gather a little more precipitation than the other months, mainly because of the intensity of the rainfall rather than the frequency of rain days (this is especially the case in summer when lightning is also much more frequent).

The number of sunshine hours is affected by the fact that because of the geographical latitude, the length of the days varies between barely eight hours in December and nearly 17 hours in June.

The following table are based on mean measurements by the KNMI weather station in De Bilt between 1991 and 2020.

See also 
 List of islands of the Netherlands
 List of places in the Netherlands
 List of mountains and hills in the Netherlands
 List of volcanoes in the Netherlands
 Extreme points of the Netherlands

References

External links 

 Map showing first two digits of postal codes (see List of postal codes in the Netherlands), ditto
 Locate town or village; find municipality it is part of, range of postal codes, and some other basic data
Lists of "places" (towns, villages, and various smaller entities), with municipality: alphabetical (ca. 4,800) – by province (extended, ca. 7,000)

Maps 
Routenet.nl Most used website for maps and directions in the Netherlands, also gives address range for a full postal code, and shows the four-digit parts of the postal codes on the maps. 
Multimap – shows geographic coordinates and allows a direct link to a map for a given location and with a given zoom level
http://route.anwb.nl/zoek_plattegrond.html
Michelin
https://web.archive.org/web/20031202194742/http://www.landkaartenindex.nl/nederland/nederland.htm (In Dutch)